ModiLuft was a private airline based in Delhi, India. It operated on domestic routes until it shut down in 1996. It maintained high standards in flight safety, ground maintenance and on-time performance owing to support from Lufthansa AG. ModiLuft's aircraft were configured in First, Business and Economy Class, making it the only private airline in India during its time to fly a three class configuration on domestic routes. It used Boeing 737-200 aircraft leased from Lufthansa and had an incident free track record of flying.

History

ModiLuft was among the first of India's first post-deregulation airlines, launched in April 1993 by the Indian industrialist S K Modi, in technical partnership with the German flag carrier Lufthansa. The German airline provided pilots and trained ModiLuft's Indian staff including pilots, cabin crew, mechanics, city and ground passenger handling staff . Lufthansa Technik provided maintenance, overhaul and spares support. The airline project, started in February, 1993 by S K Modi, Ashutosh Dayal Sharma, Yash Kohli and Kanwar K S Jamwal, first flew from New Delhi to Mumbai on 5 May 1993. The airline commenced operations within three months of its conception - a record of kinds in itself. Kanwar K. S. Jamwal, General Manager Projects, was responsible for setting up the airline and its operations and put together a team of Indian and German engineers and pilots. Capt. R L. Kapur as the Managing Director, Wing. Cdr. S. Raj (Retd.), Capt Manoj Airon, along with a team of able airline experts, RK Anand and Kavita Batra helped in meeting the aviation industry standards and in conforming to the Indian Aircraft Rules set by the Director General Civil Aviation. The first two batches of the cabin crew were trained at Lufthansa's flight crew training facility at Frankfurt. Modiluft was perhaps the only Airline to achieve an average aircraft utilization of a minimum 12 hours per day and an on-time departure CSAT score of 98.8% in Indian Skies.

The two companies had parted ways after the Indian partner accused Lufthansa of not abiding by its funding commitment. In turn, the German airline alleged that ModiLuft had defaulted on lease payments for the four Lufthansa aircraft. The relationship between the two parties soured in mid-1996 after Modi began putting pressure on Lufthansa to take a stake of up to 40 per cent in the Indian carrier.
In May 1996, Lufthansa announced that they had decided to terminate their agreement with ModiLuft. The aircraft belonging to Lufthansa were grounded due to the litigation and ModiLuft acquired Boeing 737-400 aircraft from Air UK as replacements. The future of ModiLuft, however, was already sealed and the airline ceased operations in 1996.

ModiLuft eventually returned Lufthansa's aircraft by 30 September 1997 as part of an out of court settlement. The airline ownership changed hands due to lack of funds and was renamed Royal Airways, an airline that never got off the ground. ModiLuft's Air operator's certificate (AOC) had not lapsed and was eventually used by a different set of promoters for the Low-cost carrier SpiceJet.

Destinations
South Asia

Delhi (Indira Gandhi International Airport), hub
Jammu (Jammu Airport)
Leh (Leh Kushok Bakula Rimpochee Airport)
Srinagar (Srinagar Airport)
Mumbai (Chhatrapati Shivaji International Airport)
Bengaluru (HAL Bangalore International Airport)
Hyderabad (Begumpet Airport)

Historical fleet
4 - Boeing 737-201
2 - Boeing 737-400
1 - Boeing 727-200

References

External links

Fleet information

Defunct airlines of India
Airlines established in 1993
Airlines disestablished in 1996
Indian companies disestablished in 1996
Indian companies established in 1993
Modi Enterprises
1993 establishments in Delhi
Companies based in Delhi